The following is a list of awards and nominations received by American actor, producer, and screenwriter Matt Damon throughout his career.

Damon and Ben Affleck co-wrote Good Will Hunting (1997), a screenplay about a young math genius, which received nine Academy Awards nominations, earning Damon and Affleck Oscars and Golden Globes for Best Screenplay. Damon was also nominated for an Academy Award for Best Actor for the same film. Since then he has received dozens of nominations and awards for his work as an actor, screenwriter, and producer including the Golden Globe Award for Best Actor – Motion Picture Musical or Comedy for his role in The Martian (2015).

Since Good Will Hunting Damon has received three Academy Award nominations. For his performance as Francois Pienaar in Clint Eastwood's sports drama Invictus he received an Academy Award for Best Supporting Actor nomination. For his role as the botanist and mechanical engineer Mark Watney in Ridley Scott's science fiction film The Martian (2015) he received his second Academy Award for Best Actor nomination. In 2017 he received the Academy Award for Best Picture nomination for the Kenneth Lonergan drama Manchester by the Sea (2016).

Major award associations

Academy Awards

British Academy Film Awards

Golden Globe Awards

Primetime Emmy Awards

Screen Actors Guild Awards

Others

Alliance of Women Film Journalists

American Cinematheque Award

Audie Awards

Australian Film Institute/AACTA

Awards Circuit Community Awards

Berlin International Film Festival

Blockbuster Entertainment Award

Boston Society of Film Critics Award

Broadcast Film Critics Association Award

Chicago Film Critics Association

Empire Awards

Florida Film Critics Circle Award

Humanitas Prize

Las Vegas Film Critics Society Award

London Film Critics' Circle

MTV Movie Awards

National Board of Review

Online Film Critics Society

People's Choice Awards

Phoenix Film Critics Society

Producers Guild of America

San Diego Film Critics Society

Satellite Awards

Saturn Awards

ShoWest Convention, USA

Spike Guys' Choice Awards

Teen Choice Awards

Hollywood Walk of Fame

Western Heritage Awards

Writers Guild of America

Massachusetts Institute of Technology
On June 3, 2016, Matt Damon served as commencement speaker at the Massachusetts Institute of Technology's 2016 commencement exercises. MIT President L. Rafael Reif noted that in The Martian, Damon's character Mark Watney declares himself a "space pirate": in parodic honor, Reif presented Damon with an honorary pirate's diploma, which is bestowed to select MIT students on completion of certain Physical Education requirements.

References

Damon, Matt
Awards and nominations